The 2021 Formula 4 United States Championship season was the sixth season of the Formula 4 United States Championship, a motor racing series regulated according to FIA Formula 4 regulations and sanctioned by SCCA Pro Racing, the professional racing division of the Sports Car Club of America.

Teams and drivers

Race calendar 

The 2021 calendar was announced on 5 November 2020. The series held a pre-season test at Virginia International Raceway as well as a Winter Cup at Homestead–Miami Speedway in February and March. Each round is set to feature three races. Later on, the opening rounds at Sonoma Raceway and Laguna Seca were replaced by competitions at Road Atlanta and Road America. The final round was moved forward by two weeks and supported United States Grand Prix.

Championship standings
Points were awarded as follows:

Drivers' standings

Teams' standings

Notes

References

External links 

 

United States F4 Championship seasons
United States
Formula 4 United States Championship
United States